is Japanese singer songwriter Fayray's fourth studio album and sole under the Avex Trax label. The album was released on February 19, 2003. "tears" was used as insert song in the 
Yomiuri TV/Nippon TV series drama "Message Kotoba ga, Uragitte Iku" The Final Episode.

Track listing

Charts and sales

References

External links

2003 albums
Fayray albums